Djerassi may refer to:

 Boris Djerassi (born 1952), athlete and strongman
 Carl Djerassi (1923–2015), chemist
 Djerassi Artists Residency, artists' and writers' residency 
 Djerassi Glacier, in Antarctica